The Story of My Life is a musical with music and lyrics by Neil Bartram, and a book by Brian Hill.  The show follows two childhood friends from age six to 35 and has only two characters.

The musical debuted at Canadian Stage Company in Toronto in 2006 starring Brent Carver and Jeffrey Kuhn and premiered on Broadway in February 2009, closing after nineteen previews and five regular performances.

The Story
The musical follows a lifelong friendship between two men, Alvin and Thomas, whose childhood bond continues throughout their adult years. Amazon.com describes the musical as "an authentic and affecting work, told through a series of songs in turn playful, touching and dramatic, and expertly orchestrated by Jonathan Tunick." One New York critic predicted, 'When the original cast recording comes out, see if you don't find yourself moved to Google the name of some long-lost friend with whom you simply lost touch. The Story Of My Life inspires us to reconnect with those who were part of the earliest chapters of our own life stories'."

Summary

Thomas stands alone, contemplating how to write his eulogy for his best friend Alvin's funeral. He comes to the conclusion that it should be about his life with Alvin ("Write What You Know") but cannot bring himself to write anything down. He is then visited by the ghost of Alvin, who tells him that they will write story after story about their childhood, until Thomas has completed the eulogy. Alvin walks around the room and removes stories from the room's bookshelves, which make up the musical's remaining songs.

Starting at the beginning of their friendship, Alvin recalls their meeting in "Mrs. Remington('s)" first-grade class where Alvin was the only student to recognize that Thomas was dressed as Clarence (from It's a Wonderful Life) for Halloween. The two became inseparable, with Thomas spending more and more time with Alvin in his father's bookstore. Alvin gives Thomas "The Greatest Gift" of a copy of The Adventures of Tom Sawyer, which inspires Thomas’ sixth-grade book report ("1876"). This book report inspired Thomas to be a writer and, outside the story, Thomas tries to pull the focus back to writing Alvin's eulogy.

Alvin removes a story from the shelf, which is about his abnormal tendencies and Thomas’ attempts to reign them in ("Normal"). The story ends with a group of bullies throwing Alvin's bathrobe, which belonged to his deceased mother, over a bridge. Alvin is sad but hopeful that "People Carry On" after a loss. In another story, Thomas reads his college entrance essay on the Butterfly Effect ("The Butterfly") to Alvin. Thomas is accepted into college and leaves Alvin, who is now working at his father's bookstore, behind ("Saying Goodbye, Part 1"). When Thomas comes home for Christmas, he talks about his creative process; this bores Alvin, who wants to play in the snow as they did when they were young ("Here’s Where It Begins").

Thomas leaves, graduates, and becomes a semi-famous writer. When he returns home again, he brings home his "colleague, girlfriend, and number-one fan" Anne. Alvin worries that Anne will draw Thomas away from him and seems sad about his life in the bookstore, which he assumes ownership of after his father gets sick ("Saying Goodbye, Part 2"). Thomas returns home to help Alvin with the paperwork to finish the transfer of ownership. Alvin asks Thomas to stay in town with him, but Thomas invites Alvin to join him in the city instead ("Independence Day"). After receiving many excited phone calls from Alvin, Thomas tells him that he shouldn't come after all because it's "not a good time," and then breaks up with Anne ("I Like It Here").

Thomas doesn't tell Alvin about the break-up, and tries to "streamline his personal life" to avoid writer's block. Alvin writes Thomas from the bookstore to congratulate him on his continued success ("You’re Amazing, Tom"). Thomas ignores the letters and stops coming home, suffering from writer's block while writing about the angels in the snow ("Nothing There").

Thomas goes home yet again and sneaks in to watch Alvin deliver the eulogy at his father's funeral, which is made up of "story after story after story." Thomas is mad that Alvin is at ease telling the stories and, in retrospect, recognizes that he didn't see the struggles Alvin faced at the time ("I Didn’t See Alvin"). Thomas notes that this was the last time he saw Alvin alive.

After finishing the story of his father's eulogy, Alvin attempts one last time to bring Thomas back to writing the eulogy for his own funeral ("This Is It"). Thomas finally sits to finish his "work in progress" about their childhood Christmas traditions ("Angels in the Snow"), and delivers his eulogy—a collection of stories—for Alvin.

Productions
Following developmental readings at Manhattan Theatre Club, The Eugene O'Neill Theater Center, and Canadian Stage Company, The Story of My Life was produced in Toronto at the Canadian Stage Company in 2006.  It was next produced at the National Alliance for Musical Theatre's Festival of New Musicals in the fall of 2007.

The musical then ran at Goodspeed Musicals, East Haddam, Connecticut from October 10, 2008, through November 2.  The production was directed by Richard Maltby, Jr., and featured Will Chase as Thomas Weaver and Malcolm Gets as Alvin Kelby.

The Story of My Life premiered on Broadway at the Booth Theatre on February 3, 2009, and opened officially on February 19, 2009.  Maltby directed with Chase and Gets reprising their roles. The musical closed on February 22, 2009, after five performances and 18 previews.

The Story of My Life received four 2009 Drama Desk Award nominations: Outstanding Music (Neil Bartram), Outstanding Lyrics (Neil Bartram), Outstanding Book (Brian Hill), and Outstanding Musical.
 
The Story of My Life received its first regional production in April 2010, at Act 2 Playhouse in Ambler, Pennsylvania.  It was directed by Act 2's Producing Artistic Director Bud Martin (an original producer of the Broadway production) and starred Barrymore Award Winner Tony Braithwaite as Alvin Kelby and Jim Stanek as Thomas.

The Story of My LIfe opened at the Dongsoong Art Center in central Seoul, Korea, on July 13, 2010, produced by the OD Musical Company. That production returned on October 28, 2011.

The Northern California premiere opened at Contra Costa Civic Theatre in El Cerrito, CA on November 4, 2010.  It starred William Giammona as Thomas Weaver and Paul Araquistain as Alvin Kelby.  The production was directed by Dennis M. Lickteig and Music Directed and conducted by Joe Simiele.

The Story of My Life opened at Victory Gardens Theatre in Chicago, IL on November 9, 2010.  The production is produced by Chicago Muse and stars Jack Noseworthy and Davis Duffield.

The Story of My Life film based on the 2010 Seoul Korea based OD Musical Company production released in 2011.

The San Francisco premiere of The Story of My Life opened at the New Conservatory Theater on January 28, 2012, following six previews.  It closed on February 26, 2012.  The production starred Coley Grundman as Alvin Kelby and William Giammona as Thomas Weaver.  The production was directed by Dennis Lickteig and music directed by Joe Simiele with Stage Management by Blake Kennedy.  Kuo-Hao Ho provided set design, Christian Mejia designed lights and Jessie Amoroso created the costumes.

The Atlanta premiere opened at Centerstage North on May 11, 2012, starring Kelly David Carr as Alvin Kelby and John Stanier as Thomas Weaver.  The production was directed by Julie Taliaferro with music direction by Bill Newberry, set design by Jasmine Vouge Pai, lighting design by John F. Parker Jr., and accompaniment by Barbara Capogna Macko.

"The Story of My Life" premiered in Denmark at the Fredericia Theater and ran from November 19 to December 14, 2014, and starred Søren Scheibye and Lars Molsted. The production was directed by Susan H. Schulman. 

In December 2014, The Story of My Life was played in Fakkelteater in Antwerp, Belgium.  The production stars David Imbrechts and Michaël Lejeune and is directed by Anneke Vercruysse.  This production returned in December 2015 to the same location.

Also in December 2014, The Story of My Life had its German-speaking premiere (entitled "Die Geschichte meines Lebens") in Vienna's Theater Center Forum, starring Andreas Bieber and Daniel Große Boymann who also created the German version.

In April/May 2018 "The Story of My Life" was played at Himmerlands Teater in Hobro, Denmark, and starred Sune Kofoed as Alvin and Ronny Sterlø as Tom. The production was directed by Susanne Sangill.

In 2022, The Story of My Life ("La Storia della mia vita", adapted into Italian by Sara Moschin) is to debut in Italy.  The production stars Fabrizio Voghera as Thomas Weaver and Francesco Nardo as Alvin Kelby and is directed by Ilaria Deangelis.

Song List

The original Broadway Cast Album was produced by PS Classics.

 Write What You Know - Thomas Weaver
 Mrs. Remington - Alvin Kelby
 The Greatest Gift - Alvin Kelby and Thomas Weaver
 1876 - Thomas Weaver
 Normal - Thomas Weaver
 People Carry On - Alvin Kelby
 The Butterfly - Thomas Weaver
 Saying Goodbye (Part 1) - Thomas Weaver and Alvin Kelby
 Here's Where It Begins - Thomas Weaver and Alvin Kelby
 Saying Goodbye (Part 2) - Thomas Weaver and Alvin Kelby
 Independence Day - Alvin Kelby
 Saying Goodbye (Part 3) - Thomas Weaver and Alvin Kelby
 I Like It Here - Thomas Weaver
 You're Amazing, Tom - Alvin Kelby
 Nothing There/Saying Goodbye (Part 4) - Thomas Weaver and Alvin Kelby
 I Didn't See Alvin - Thomas Weaver
 This Is It - Alvin Kelby and Thomas Weaver
 Angels in the Snow - Alvin Kelby and Thomas Weaver

Response
Ben Brantley, in a review in The New York Times, wrote that "In addition to jettisoning the usual excesses of tourist-trapping extravaganzas, they have tossed away such niceties as originality, credibility, tension and excitement...Mr. Chase and Mr. Gets sing and act with winning (and, under the circumstances, merciful) restraint."

Michael Kuchwara, in his Associated Press review, wrote "The Story of My Life is a heartfelt little musical that has the courage of its sweet-tempered, low-key convictions. These days, that's a novelty. In a Broadway world of big musicals determined to sell themselves, this gentle new show celebrates softly but with an emotional pull that slowly wins you over."

David Finkle wrote in TheaterMania.com: "...composer-lyricist Neil Bartram and librettist Brian Hill have come up with something good, but had they also supplied the story crouching behind the story, they could have produced an ultimately more satisfying piece of theater."

Matthew Murray in TalkinBroadway.com: "...it prides itself on regurgitating ideas and feelings others have described more originally, more specifically, and more richly elsewhere. When Thomas and Alvin describe their disintegrating relationship with lines like "The symbolism was glaringly obvious" and "The usual platitudes hung in the air," it's heartbreaking how intimately you understand exactly what they mean."

NY1's Roma Torre said "Partners Neil Bartram, who wrote the music and lyrics, and Brian Hill, who wrote the obviously Sondheim-inspired book, fine-tuned this work with a keen insight for those seemingly inconsequential moments in relationships that turn out to be magically momentous. Bartram's lovely songs resonate on many levels, while Richard Maltby Jr. adds further dimension with his sharply-etched direction. Will Chase as Thomas and Malcolm Gets as Alvin are exceptionally talented. So perfectly matched in ways both subtle and large, they deliver splendidly calibrated performances that are simply flawless....This is an impressive collaborative effort that, despite its minimalism, has the power to pack quite an emotional punch."

References

External links
 
 Internet Broadway Database listing
 Official site
 Official site, Bartram and Hill
 "What Inspired The Story of My Life" playbill.com, Feb. 9, 2009
 The Story of My Life at the Music Theatre International website
 The Story of My Life in Fakkelteater, Antwerp, Belgium

2008 musicals
Broadway musicals
Original musicals
One-act musicals
Two-handers
Canadian musicals